Peter Hess can refer to:

 Peter Hess (boxer) (born 1946), German boxer
 Peter Hess (landowner) (1779-1855), Canadian landowner
 Peter Hess (Swiss politician) (born 1948), Swiss politician
 Peter von Hess (1792-1871), German painter